The following list includes notable people, past and present, who were born or have lived in Duluth, Minnesota, the second-largest city (and first-largest U.S. city) on the shores of Lake Superior.

Business and industry
W. T. Bailey (1842–1914), 19th and 20th-century lumber tycoon who kept his headquarters in Duluth
Bob Chinn, owner of Bob Chinn's Crab House, highest grossing restaurant in America
Thomas F. Cole (1862–1939), mining executive; president of Oliver Iron Mining Company after its merge with U.S. Steel
Chester Adgate Congdon (1853–1916), attorney and investor
Alan and Dale Klapmeier, founders of Cirrus Aircraft; pioneered the use of composites, glass cockpits and ballistic parachutes for production aircraft; inducted into National Aviation Hall of Fame (2014)
Seven Iron Brothers, also known as the Merritt brothers of Duluth, discovered iron ore in 1890 in the Mesabi Iron Range
David Oreck (1923–2023), entrepreneur and lecturer 
Jeno Paulucci (1918–2011), entrepreneur, philanthropist and food industry magnate; founder of Chun King, Jeno's Inc., and Bellisio Foods; creator of the pizza roll

Entertainment
Odin Biron, actor
Otis Dozovic, professional wrestler for World Wrestling Entertainment 
Dale Arnold, sportscaster for WEEI-FM and NESN
Dorothy Arnold, actress; first wife of baseball player Joe DiMaggio
Maria Bamford, comedian and television actress; American Comedy Award for Best Club Comic (2014)
Mitch Clem, cartoonist
Marguerite De La Motte, silent movie actress
Carol Dempster, silent movie actress
Daniel Durant, stage and film actor
Jane Frazee, actress
Peggy Knudsen, actress
Don LaFontaine (1940-2008), prolific voice-over actor of film and video-game trailers, television advertisements, and network promotions; popularized the phrase "In a world..."
Jessica Lange, photographer and Academy, Emmy, Tony, SAG and Golden Globe Award-winning actress; tied as the sixth most Oscar-nominated actress in history, born in Cloquet and resided in Duluth 
Verne Lundquist, CBS sportscaster
Chris Monroe, cartoonist and children's book illustrator
Edna Munsey, stage and silent film actress
Lorenzo Music, voice actor, raised in Duluth
Gena Lee Nolin, actress
Charles Nolte (1923-2010), actor and director, born in Duluth 
Dennis Shryack, screenwriter

Music
Bill Berry, drummer for the band R.E.M. 
Haley Bonar, folk music singer and songwriter
David Dondero, indie-folk musician
Bob Dylan, iconic Grammy and Academy Award-winning folk singer and songwriter; spearheaded the American folk music revival during mid-1960s; inducted into Rock and Roll Hall of Fame (1988); Nobel Prize in Literature (2016), born in Duluth
Sadik Hakim, jazz pianist, played on Charlie Parker's famous "Ko-Ko" session
Dan Murphy, Soul Asylum band member and founder
Charlie Parr, folk musician
Rivulets, slowcore band, founder Nathan Amundson originates from Duluth
Alice Sjoselius (1888-1982), concert singer, voice teacher
Phil Solem, musician
Alan Sparhawk, and wife Mimi Parker, founding members of the indie rock and slowcore band Low
Trampled by Turtles, bluegrass band, hails from Duluth and refers to the city in several songs

Politics and law
Salisbury Adams (1925-2004), Minnesota state legislator and lawyer
John Antila (1902-1969), Minnesota state legislator and businessman
Melvin Baldwin, U.S. Representative
William W. Billson, Minnesota state senator and lawyer
Gordon H. Butler, Minnesota state senator
Chester Adgate Congdon (1853-1916), lawyer and capitalist
Albert J. Connors, Wisconsin state senator
Harold J. Dahl (1930-1989), Minnesota state legislator and judge
Richard E. Ferrario (1931-1985), Minnesota state senator and educator
Alfred E. France, Minnesota state representative and businessman
Ben E. Gustafson, Minnesota state legislator and businessman 
Earl B. Gustafson, Minnesota state legislator, judge, and lawyer
James Gustafson, Minnesota State Senator and businessman
Richard H. Hanson (1931-2023), Minnesota state legislator
Gerald Heaney (1918-2010), United States Circuit Judge
Arlene Ione Lehto, Minnesota state legislator and businesswoman
Charles Lundy Lewis, Minnesota Supreme Court justice
Robert Mahoney, Michigan state legislator
Sidney Redding Mason, Minnesota state legislator and businessman
Henry Louis Morin, Minnesota state senator, farmer, and laborunion activist
Page Morris (1853-1924), United States Representative (1897-1903) and United States District Judge (1903-1924)
Thomas Francis O'Malley (1889-1954), Minnesota state legislator and railroad conductor
Richard F. Palmer, Minnesota state legislator and newspaper editor
Samuel F. Snively, Mayor of Duluth from 1921 to 1937; pushed for the creation of numerous parks and boulevards throughout the city; longest running Mayor in Duluth's history
Ozora P. Stearns, lawyer and U.S. senator from Minnesota (1871)
Pat Sullivan, Majority Leader of the Washington House of Representatives
Dwight A. Swanstrom, Minnesota state legislator and businessman
Gordon Voss, Minnesota state legislator
Gerald Willet, Minnesota state legislator and businessman

Sports
Mason Aguirre, professional snowboarder, competed in 2006 Winter Olympics
Jim Ahern, professional golfer, played on PGA Tour and Champions Tour
Greg Anderson, drag racer, Pro Stock NHRA champion
Herbert Clow, National Football League, 1920s
Jack Connolly, hockey player, Hobey Baker Award winner (2012), captain of 2011 Minnesota-Duluth men's NCAA championship team
Gary DeGrio, professional ice hockey forward
Dan Devine, captain of UMD football team, later coached the Missouri Tigers, Notre Dame Fighting Irish, and Green Bay Packers
Ethan Finlay, soccer player
Derek Forbort, hockey player for the Boston Bruins
Dates Fryberger, hockey player in 1964 Winter Olympics
Kara Goucher, distance runner, world championships silver medalist, 2008 and 2012 Olympian
C. J. Ham, running back for Minnesota Vikings
Phil Hoene, hockey player, native Duluthian, played for UMD and Los Angeles Kings
Bill Irwin, professional wrestler, known in WWE as "The Goon"
Lenny Lane, professional wrestler
Drew LeBlanc, hockey player, Hobey Baker Award winner (2013)
Jim McNally, Olympic sport shooter
Russ Method, football player
Bill O'Toole, football player
Neal Pionk, hockey player for the Winnipeg Jets
Chris Plys, curler, 2010 Winter Olympic team
Joe Polo, curler, 2006 Winter Olympic team
Rick Rickert, basketball player, University of Minnesota and New Zealand Breakers
Barbara Rotvig, AAGPBL player
John Shuster, Olympic curling medalist
Whitey Skoog, basketball player, University of Minnesota and Minneapolis Lakers
Gordy Soltau, NFL player for San Francisco 49ers
Jamie Trachsel, head softball coach at Ole Miss; former head coach at Minnesota, Iowa State and North Dakota State
Katie Vesterstein, skier
Darren Ward, Olympic swimmer
Butch Williams, NHL player
Tom Williams (1940-1992), NHL player, 1960 Winter Olympics gold medalist

Writers and journalists
Margaret Culkin Banning, best-selling author of 36 novels; early women's rights advocate
Carol Bly, author
Irving Copi, philosopher, logician and textbook author
Marty Essen, ten-time award-winning author, photographer, professional speaker 
Roger Grimsby, journalist, television news anchor and actor
David Hagberg, author of international thrillers
Steve Hagen, Zen author and priest
Amy Hoff, Scottish historian, folklorist, writer, and director
Louis Jenkins, author and poet
Sinclair Lewis (1885-1951), author and Nobel laureate, wrote the novel Cass Timberlane while a resident of Duluth
John L. Morrison, newspaper publisher
Lauran Paine (1916-2001), author
Rick Shefchik, author, historian and journalist

Others
Scott D. Anderson (1965-1999), author and pilot; successfully flew all in-flight test-deployments of the Cirrus Airframe Parachute System; inducted into Minnesota Aviation Hall of Fame (2010)
Mike Colalillo (1925-2011), Medal of Honor recipient (US Army, World War II) 
Henry A. Courtney Jr. (1916-1945), posthumous Medal of Honor recipient (US Marine Corps, World War II)
John H. Darling, engineer and astronomer
Robert R. Gilruth (1913-2000), first director of NASA's Manned Spacecraft Center; served during programs Mercury, Gemini and Apollo; inducted into National Aviation Hall of Fame (1994), raised in Duluth
Robert Isabell (1952-2009), event planner
Kay Kurt, painter
Nika Nesgoda, conceptual artist and photographer
William P. Levine, U.S. Army major general and Holocaust speaker
Janet McCarter Woolley (1906-1996), tuberculosis researcher
Ellen Pence, scholar and social activist, created Duluth Model of intervention in domestic violence
Frederick Emil Resche (1866–1946), U.S. Army brigadier general
Erik Sommer, artist
Sarah Burger Stearns, first president of the Minnesota Woman Suffrage Association
Gloria Tew (1923-2022), abstract sculptor
Oliver G. Traphagen (1854-1932), architect
Albert Woolson (February 11, 1850 – August 2, 1956), last Union civil war soldier to die

See also
History of Minnesota
List of people from Minnesota

References

 
Duluth